Václav Klaus Jr. (Czech: Václav Klaus ml. or mladší, ; born 10 September 1969) is a Czech teacher and politician. He was a member of the Civic Democratic Party (ODS) until his expulsion in March 2019. Klaus was a Member of the Chamber of Deputies (MP) from 2017 to 2021.

He is the son of former Czech president Václav Klaus.

Early life and career
Klaus was born on 10 September 1969 to Václav Klaus and his wife Livia Klausová. He graduated from the Faculty of Science of Charles University in 1992.

He became Headmaster of PORG Grammar School in 1998. During his tenure, the school had the best results in the country in 2011 state graduation exams. He left the school in 2014. He was also an adviser to Education Minister Josef Dobeš at the time.

Political career

Education adviser
In March 2014, Klaus became Chief Education Adviser to the Civic Democratic Party (ODS). Klaus is highly critical of Minister of Education Kateřina Valachová, and opposed her changes to the roles of school headmasters. He also opposes inclusion, and expressed support for a headmistress who banned the wearing of Hijabs in her school.

2017 legislative election
Klaus rejoined ODS in January 2016, having previously been a member from 2002 to 2008.

On 26 September 2016, Klaus announced his intention to participate in the 2017 legislative election. Klaus won the first nomination on 26 January 2017, supported by the Prague 6 ODS organisation. He participated in the legislative election in Prague, where he was third on the ODS ballot.

He supports Czech withdrawal from the European Union and a strict immigration policy. He was suggested by some political commentators like Petr Honzejk and Martin Zvěřina as a possible future leader of the party, and possible rival to the incumbent leader, Petr Fiala, but he was expelled on 16 March 2019, with party officials citing his controversial behaviour.

He was elected a Member of the Chamber of Deputies and received over 20,000 preferential votes, the second highest total of all candidates. He subsequently became the Chairman of the Education Committee.

Klaus Jr. became involved in conflicts with the party leadership following his election to the Chamber of Deputies due to his controversial statements and his support for Ladislav Jakl during the 2018 Senate election. This resulted in his expulsion from the party in March 2019. Zuzana Majerová-Zahradníková reacted to Klaus's expulsion by resigning from the party.

Tricolour
Following his expulsion from ODS, Klaus Jr. announced that he would found a new party. He introduced the party, the Tricolour Citizens' Movement, at a press conference on 10 June 2019. 

In March 2021, Klaus Jr. announced his resignation from all political functions for personal reasons.

Center for Civil Liberties

In 2017, Klaus founded a think tank, the Center for Civil Liberties, focused on civil liberties, economic issues, and education. Klaus said that his aim is for the institute to compete with the Václav Havel Library.

Personal life
Klaus married his first wife Kamila Pojslová in 1995. They have three children. He divorced Kamila in 2010 and married his second wife Lucie Hřebáčková in 2013. They have a daughter, Eliška. On 25 October 2017, Klaus announced a divorce from his second wife. The announcement came only five days after he was elected to parliament, which led to speculation that the divorce was caused by his political activities.

Klaus has a congenital cosmetic defect on his face.

References 

1969 births
Living people
Civic Democratic Party (Czech Republic) MPs
Politicians from Prague
Children of national leaders
Charles University alumni
Czech eurosceptics
Tricolour Citizens' Movement politicians
Members of the Chamber of Deputies of the Czech Republic (2017–2021)